N75 may refer to:

Roads 
 N75 road (Ireland)
 N-75 National Highway, in Pakistan
 Davao–Cotabato Road, in the Philippines

Other uses 
 Escadrille N.75, a unit of the French Air Force
 Gurr-Goni language
 , a submarine of the Royal Navy
 Nikon N75, a camera
 Nokia N75, a mobile phone
 Twin Pine Airport, in Mercer County, New Jersey, United States